Admiral The Honourable Sir Cyril Eustace Douglas-Pennant KCB CBE DSO DSC (7 April 1894 – 3 April 1961) was a Royal Navy officer who went on to be Commander-in-Chief, The Nore.

Naval career
Born the son of Frank Douglas-Pennant, 5th Baron Penrhyn, Cyril Douglas-Pennant joined the Royal Navy in 1907. He served in World War I.

He also served in World War II as Captain of the cruiser .

After the War he became Commandant of the Joint Services Staff College and then Flag Officer (Air) and Second in Command of the Mediterranean Fleet in 1948. He was appointed Senior Naval Representative for the British Joint Services Mission to Washington, D.C., in 1950 and Commander-in-Chief, The Nore, in 1952. He retired in 1953.

Family
In 1917 he married Phyllis Constance Leigh. Following a divorce from his first wife, he married Sheila Brotherhood in 1937.

References

1894 births
1961 deaths
Douglas-Pennant family
Knights Commander of the Order of the Bath
Commanders of the Order of the British Empire
Companions of the Distinguished Service Order
Recipients of the Distinguished Service Cross (United Kingdom)
Royal Navy admirals of World War II
Eldest sons of British hereditary barons
Heirs apparent who never acceded
English cricketers
Royal Navy cricketers
Royal Navy officers of World War I